Victoriano José Frágola (born 21 July 1994) is an Argentine professional footballer who plays as a centre-back for B71. Besides Argentina, he has played in Bolivia, Dominican Republic, the United States, and the Faroe Islands.

Career
Frágola had youth spells with Douglas Haig, Gimnasia y Esgrima de Pergamino, Club Atlético Jorge Griffa and Atlético de Rafaela. He began his senior career with Torneo Federal A team Tiro Federal. He made his debut on 22 March 2015 during a loss to Sportivo Las Parejas, though Frágola had made it 1–1 after netting his first career goal. August 2016 saw Frágola move to Uruguay with Segunda División outfit Canadian. However, in September, the defender penned terms with San José of the Bolivian Primera División. He scored on debut against Sport Boys on 16 October, before netting versus Nacional Potosí on 30 November.

Early 2017 saw Frágola head to the Dominican Republic with Atlántico. In August of that year, Frágola returned to his homeland with Torneo Federal A's Douglas Haig. He made sixteen total appearances, ten as a starter, across 2017–18, though was sent off in his final match for them on 12 March 2018 away to Gimnasia y Esgrima (CdU). After departing Douglas Haig months later, Frágola moved to National Premier Soccer League club Naples United in the United States. In early 2019, Frágola had a short stint back in Bolivian football with Tarija regional team Club Atlético Bermejo before returning to the US with Naples United in mid-2019.

In June 2019, it was revealed that Frágola had reported former team San José to FIFA due to unpaid wages; totalling $3,000, which the governing body forced the Bolivians to pay in the succeeding July. On 2 February 2021, Frágola completed a move to the Faroe Islands with 1. deild side B71; becoming the club's first Argentine player.

Career statistics
.

References

External links

1994 births
Living people
People from Pergamino
Argentine footballers
Association football defenders
Argentine expatriate footballers
Expatriate footballers in Uruguay
Expatriate footballers in Bolivia
Expatriate footballers in the Dominican Republic
Expatriate soccer players in the United States
Expatriate footballers in the Faroe Islands
Argentine expatriate sportspeople in Uruguay
Argentine expatriate sportspeople in Bolivia
Argentine expatriate sportspeople in the Dominican Republic
Argentine expatriate sportspeople in the United States
Argentine expatriate sportspeople in the Faroe Islands
Torneo Federal A players
Bolivian Primera División players
Liga Dominicana de Fútbol players
National Premier Soccer League players
Tiro Federal footballers
Canadian Soccer Club players
Club San José players
Atlántico FC players
Club Atlético Douglas Haig players
Naples United FC players
B71 Sandoy players
Sportspeople from Buenos Aires Province